Hunsbury Hill is an Iron Age hill fort two miles (3 km) south-west of the centre of the town of Northampton in the county of Northamptonshire.

It is probable that defences were  built at Hunsbury Hill between the 7th and 4th centuries BC. The deep ditch excavated has  survived to the present day. A wooden rampart was
also constructed; there is evidence that Hunsbury hill fort's inner ramparts were burned down and vitrified; this is rare in England.

Ironstone extraction began at the hill fort in about 1883, after an attempt to have the site protected under   the Ancient Monuments Act of 1882 failed due to the cost of compensating the landowner. Many of the fort's internal features were destroyed, but the work revealed up to 300 pits which, according to the curator of Northampton Museum in 1887, contained "numerous artefacts that now comprise one of the finest collections... of Prehistoric antiquities in England". The finds included iron weapons and tools, bronze brooches, pottery, glass and around 159 quern-stones. All were given to the town's museum.

Hunsbury Hill fort is a designated Scheduled Ancient Monument. Parts of the fort's banks have been badly eroded because of the 19th century quarrying, the effects of burrowing European rabbits and damage from tree roots. It is now managed as a park by West Northamptonshire Council.

Part of the route of the railway built for the quarrying remains and beginning in 1975 has been modified for use by the Northamptonshire Ironstone Railway Trust who added a new line. The track is used and maintained by the Trust. As the use of the quarries finished by 1920 the original  gauge track was not used. The Trust laid a mixture of standard gauge,  gauge and  track but from 1982 only standard gauge track has been used.

The area around the hill is the large Northampton housing estate called West Hunsbury.

References

Hills of Northamptonshire
Tourist attractions in Northamptonshire
Hill forts in Northamptonshire
Parks and open spaces in Northamptonshire